This is a list of science centers in the United States. American Alliance of Museums (AAM) and Association of Science and Technology Centers (ASTC) member centers are granted institutional benefits and may offer benefits to individuals through purchased or granted individual memberships as well.  ASTC offers a "passport" that allows for free general entry at all other participating ASTC member centers outside of a 90-mile radius of home.  AAM offers a similar program that offers benefits to individuals.

AAM accredited museums have obtained a seal of approval from the AAM Accreditation Program that ensures a museum's "commitment to excellence, accountability, high professional standards and continued institutional improvement."

This is a comprehensive list of ASTC centers, but it is not comprehensive for AAM museums.  Any type of museum can be associated with AAM, whereas ASTC associates specifically with science centers and technology-based collections.

See also
 List of museums in the United States
 List of natural history museums in the United States
 List of science museums
List of university museums in the United States

References

 
Science centers
Museums